Ludwig Ganglbauer  (1 October 1856, Vienna- 5 June 1912, Rekawinkel, near Kaltenbach Lower Austria), was an Austrian entomologist who specialised in Coleoptera (i.e. beetles). 

Ganglbauer became interested in insects during early childhood.  Educated at the Schottengymnasium in Vienna, he later obtained a teaching certificate from the University of Vienna, and then taught high school for a few years.  He subsequently took a job at the Wiener Hofmuseum (now the Vienna Museum of Natural History).

In 1881, he co-founded the journal Wiener Entomologische Zeitung.  He became  director of the Department for Zoology at the Vienna Natural History Museum in 1906.  Ganglbauer wrote Die Käfer von Mitteleuropa (Beetles of Central Europe), 4 vols., 1892-1904 which was unfinished at his death, but is still widely read by entomologists.

References

External links

Portrait

Austrian entomologists
Coleopterists
1856 births
1912 deaths